Catenulispora subtropica is a bacterium from the genus of Catenulispora which has been isolated from soil from a paddy field from the Iriomote Island.

References

Actinomycetia
Bacteria described in 2008